Cephalodiplosporium is a genus of fungi in the Nectriaceae.

References

External links 

 Cephalodiplosporium at Mycobank

Nectriaceae genera